Liepen is a village and a former municipality in the Vorpommern-Greifswald district, in Mecklenburg-Vorpommern, Germany. Since 1 January 2014, it is part of the municipality Neetzow-Liepen.

References

Former municipalities in Mecklenburg-Western Pomerania